The 1950–51 British Home Championship football tournament was the Home Nations follow-up to England's disastrous appearance at their first World Cup, the 1950 FIFA World Cup in Brazil. There the much vaunted English had been beaten by the USA and Spain. The Scots had refused to go, and the Welsh and the Irish had failed to qualify. The Scots went on to capitalise on the demoralised English by taking the Home Championship away from them too.

The tournament began with wins for the favourites away from home, England beating the Irish and Scotland the Welsh. In the second matches, this dominance was emphasised with powerful wins by England in Sunderland over the Welsh and Scotland who beat the Irish 6–1 including four goals from Billy Steel. In the final game at Wembley Stadium, a tense and furious game brought the trophy to Scotland, who finished 3–2 winners. Wales had already beaten Ireland to claim third spot.

Table

Results

References

1951
1950–51 in Northern Ireland association football
1950–51 in English football
1950–51 in Scottish football
1950–51 in Welsh football
1950 in British sport
1951 in British sport